James Bondy (born ) is a Canadian entertainer, mainly known for his work as the co-host of the children's show Ribert and Robert's Wonderworld, which airs on public television.

Background
James Bondy had aspirations to become a hockey player or a dentist while in school, but a high school drama coach encouraged him to try out for a school play. He was cast as a lead and starred in every school play through graduation. In 1993, Bondy was accepted into the musical theater degree program at the University of Windsor from which he graduated. Key roles on the college stage, in local repertory productions, and the Windsor Light Opera Company followed, and Bondy eventually relocated to Toronto in 1997 to pursue a professional career.

Early career
Bondy was chosen to help open the Disney's Animal Kingdom at Walt Disney World by starring in a production of Disney's Journey into the Jungle Book. After over eight hundred performances,  James Bondy returned to Windsor, where he performed in sold-out revues at the casinos in Windsor and across the river in Detroit, Michigan. Bondy performed on the Renaissance Cruise Lines, headlining musical revues until the September 11, 2001 terrorist attacks, forcing him to return to Toronto.

Bondy then gained experience in film, working as an extra and bit player, until he returned to performing aboard cruise ships in 2003, performing for another six months on the Norwegian Cruise Lines.

Ribert and Robert's Wonderworld
During this stint aboard a cruise line,  James Bondy was approached by the creator of a new children's show. He had seen Bondy perform and was convinced that he had found the human co-host he was looking for. When Bondy's contract with the cruise line expired, he began filming episodes of the live-action/animated series Ribert and Robert's Wonderworld. The series was picked up by American Public Television and can now be seen on over a hundred public television stations in North America. Bondy filmed 78 episodes which can be seen daily in many major cities in and around the United States.

Music career
In 2004,  James Bondy recorded an album of Broadway tunes and soft hits, Songs From the Heart.

He continues to perform in New York City as a guitar/vocalist solo artist.

Personal life
James Bondy met his wife while she was working as a dancer aboard the cruise ship; they lived together in New York City. Bondy is a fan of the Toronto Maple Leafs and Toronto Blue Jays. Bondy enjoys golf for relaxation.

References

 http://www.jamesbondy.com

1970s births
Living people
Musicians from Windsor, Ontario
University of Windsor alumni
Year of birth missing (living people)
Canadian male musical theatre actors